Tuymazinsky District (Bashkir and , Tuymazı rayonı) is an administrative and municipal district (raion), one of the fifty-four in the Republic of Bashkortostan, Russia. It is located in the west of the republic and borders with Sharansky District in the north, Buzdyaksky District in the east, Belebeyevsky District in the southeast and south, Yermekeyevsky District in the south, and with the Republic of Tatarstan in the west. Its administrative center is the town of Tuymazy (which is administratively separate from the district). As of the 2010 Census, the total population of the district was 64,389.

History
The district was established on August 20, 1930. On March 20, 1937, the district was split into two—Tuymazinsky and Kandrinsky—but that was reversed in 1956.

Administrative and municipal status
Within the framework of administrative divisions, Tuymazinsky District is one of the fifty-four in the Republic of Bashkortostan. It is divided into 18 selsoviets, comprising 113 rural localities. The town of Tuymazy serves as its administrative center, despite being incorporated separately as a town of republic significance—an administrative unit with the status equal to that of the districts.

As a municipal division, the district is incorporated as Tuymazinsky Municipal District, with the town of republic significance of Tuymazy being incorporated within it as Tuymazy Urban Settlement. Its eighteen selsoviets are incorporated as eighteen rural settlements within the municipal district. The town of Tuymazy serves as the administrative center of the municipal district as well.

References

Notes

Sources

Districts of Bashkortostan
States and territories established in 1930